"Primadonna" is a song by Welsh singer-songwriter Marina Diamandis, released under the stage name Marina and the Diamonds, from her second studio album, Electra Heart (2012). It was released on 20 March 2012 as the album's official lead single. It reached the top five in Austria, Ireland and New Zealand and the top twenty in the United Kingdom, Hungary and Switzerland.

Background and concept
Diamandis first came up with the title for the track in July 2011. Recorded in October 2011, "Primadonna" was the last song to be recorded for Electra Heart and in her words, 'picked itself as the first single off the album.'

Diamandis has said of the song:
It's about not needing anybody when it comes to love—your raison d'être is to live for adoration. Girls usually feel like this when they are not appreciated in a relationship. The inspiration for the song came from an ex-boyfriend. He thought it was funny that I was a mega drama queen always talking "global love" this, "global love" that! He called me a prima donna. I love it but I also kind of hate it. Like they say, "You only hate in others what you hate in yourself", so I thought I'd channel this well-known but kind of undesirable character type into a pop song. As the saying goes (that I just made up): You've either been one or dated one at least once in your life.

Composition
"Primadonna" has a length of three minutes and thirty-eight seconds. It is a dance-pop song that blends grinding disco and electropop beats with elements of Europop. Diamandis' vocals in the song have been described as operatic. Revolving around an anti-chorus song structure, the chorus is sung in a high tone over sparkly instrumentation before the beat drops to grinding four on the floor verses, where she sings in the gravelly tones of her lower register.

Critical reception
Robert Copesy of Digital Spy rated the track four out of five stars, writing that in the line "Got you wrapped around my finger babe/You can count on me to misbehave", Diamandis "play[s] out one of many female archetypes that feature on her forthcoming LP—though we suspect it's one she identifies with best." Sam Lansky of MTV Buzzworthy described it as "a monster song" and "a muscular uptempo joint", concluding, "Evoking Kate Bush on the high notes and then cascading down to the gravelly tones of her lower register, Marina's voice packs the track with verve and personality." Katherine St Asaph of Popdust gave the song three-and-a-half stars "edging toward 4", referring to it as "a big ball of irony sprinkled with mockery and shoved beneath a blonde wig, roots be damned". On the other hand, Luke Turner of the NME wrote that in the wake of Madonna's contributions, "plonkers like Marina have got empowerment wrong, coming up with this: Europop fart beats and cloying vocals. Marina would do well to learn that ego needs something to back it up, which you won't find in this giant guff of saccharine nothing." Also, Elizabeth McGeown, writing for Irish webzine State, dismissed "Primadonna" as a "wannabe feminist [anthem] disguised in a Mean Girls-esque dialogue. Admittedly, it doesn't take itself seriously. Heavily pop culture laden, it contains a tongue-in-cheek superficiality."

"Primadonna" was well received within the first hours of its release to radio by fans and new listeners alike, especially on the social networking site Twitter where it was a worldwide trending topic.

Commercial performance
"Primadonna" debuted at number eleven on the UK Singles Chart with 25,337 copies sold in its first week, giving Diamandis her highest-charting single in the United Kingdom to date and only narrowly missing the top 10 by 525 sales. As of 1 February 2018, the song had sold 300,000 combined units in the UK. As of 5 February 2019, the song has sold 334,000 combined units in the UK. On 30 October 2020, sales and streams of "Primadonna" passed 400,000 units and was awarded a Gold certification from the British Phonographic Industry. In its third week on the Irish Singles Chart, "Primadonna" rose to a new peak of number three, becoming Diamandis's highest-charting single in Ireland as well. The song peaked at number four in New Zealand, her first single to chart in that country.

"Primadonna" also saw success on pop radio formats in the United States, bubbling under the respective Billboard Pop Songs chart. The song also saw a certain amount of club play, almost charting on the Hot Dance Club Songs chart. In May 2017, "Primadonna" was certified Gold by the RIAA for sales exceeding 500,000 copies. In 2021 it crossed the one million sales mark in the United States and was awarded Platinum.

Music video
The music video was directed by Casper Balslev and shot in Copenhagen. It serves as the fourth part of the Electra Heart series, for which Balslev also directed the videos for part 1 ("Fear and Loathing") and part 2 ("Radioactive"). The video premiered on 12 March 2012, the same day as the song's release to UK radio. Two days prior to the video's release, Diamandis released a fifteen-second preview of the video.

Track listings

 UK CD single
 "Primadonna" – 3:41
 "Primadonna" (Kat Krazy Remix) – 3:39
 "Primadonna" (Walden Remix) – 6:21
 "Primadonna" (Burns Remix) – 4:29

 Digital EP (remixes)
 "Primadonna" – 3:41
 "Primadonna" (Benny Benassi Remix) – 7:05
 "Primadonna" (Riva Starr Remix) – 5:45
 "Primadonna" (Burns Remix) – 4:29
 "Primadonna" (Evian Christ Remix) – 3:44

 US digital EP (remixes)
 "Primadonna" (Walden Remix) – 6:20
 "Primadonna" (Benny Benassi Remix) – 7:05
 "Primadonna" (Kat Krazy Remix) – 4:52
 "Primadonna" (Burns Remix) – 4:29
 "Primadonna" (Evian Christ Remix) – 3:44
 "Primadonna" (Riva Starr Remix) – 5:45
 "Primadonna" (Until the Ribbon Breaks Remix) – 3:47

 German CD single and digital download
 "Primadonna" – 3:41
 "Primadonna" (Benny Benassi Remix) – 7:05

Charts

Weekly charts

Year-end charts

Certifications

Release history

References

2012 singles
2011 songs
679 Artists singles
Atlantic Records singles
Elektra Records singles
Marina Diamandis songs
Song recordings produced by Cirkut (record producer)
Song recordings produced by Dr. Luke
Songs with feminist themes
Songs written by Dr. Luke
Songs written by Julie Frost
Songs written by Marina Diamandis
Works about narcissism